The Dhiraila (Thereila, Thiralla) were an indigenous Australian people of the state of Queensland.

Language
According to Gavan Breen, the Thereila language was known as Mamwura or Mambanjura (Mambanyura).

Country
They lay south of Nockatunga and Noccundra, as far as the Grey Range. They were present at Dingera Creek. Their western confines were around Bransby and the lower Warrywarry Creek.

Alternative names
 Thiralla.
 Mambanjura.
 Mambanyura.
 Mambangura.
 Mamwura.
 Ngandangura.

Notes

Citations

Sources

Aboriginal peoples of Queensland